Bluegrass Brewing Company is a brewery and a chain of brewpubs based in Louisville, Kentucky, USA.

History (production)

Bluegrass Brewing Company was founded as a brewpub in Louisville, Kentucky in 1993 by chief brewer David Pierce and a small group of beer investors. In the late 1990s, Pipkin Brewing Company began contract brewing and bottling Bluegrass Brewing Company beers. In 2001, the Bluegrass Brewing Company purchased the Pipkin Brewing Company, at which time was located at 636 East Main Street, Louisville. In 2001, the brewpub and brewery split into two separate companies with a mutual name. The Main Street brewery packaged and distributed regionally and the brewpub produced beer for the pub and a non-brewing satellite location at 660 4th Street in Louisville. The Main Street location rebranded in 2015 to Goodwood Brewing as it was a separate company. The only current active location is 300 West Main Street.

Awards
The brewery regularly competes in the Great American Beer Festival, and its beers have won a number of awards including multiple gold medals for the Bearded Pat's Barleywine, a gold medal in 2003 for its smoked beer "Black Silk" and a bronze medal, also in 2003, for its Dortmunder-style lager beer, and most recently in 2008 for Kick in the Baltic Porter.

References

External links
Official Microbrewery Site
Official Brewpub Site

Beer brewing companies based in Kentucky
Companies based in Louisville, Kentucky
Cuisine of Louisville, Kentucky
1993 establishments in Kentucky
Food and drink companies established in 1993
American companies established in 1993